Giampaolo Rupil (born 24 July 1955) is an Italian cross-country skier. He competed in the men's 15 kilometre event at the 1980 Winter Olympics.

References

1955 births
Living people
Italian male cross-country skiers
Olympic cross-country skiers of Italy
Cross-country skiers at the 1980 Winter Olympics
Place of birth missing (living people)